Chen Luyu, born 12 June 1970, is a Chinese journalist and talk show host with Phoenix Television. She has been described as "China's Oprah" owing to the popularity of her talk show.
She hosts the talk show programme A Date With Luyu.

Awards
 Jessica magazine's (Hong Kong) "2007 Most Successful Women" title

TV shows:
   A Date with Luyu

Education:
 Communication University of China
 Tsinghua University High School
 Experimental Middle School Affiliated to Beijing Normal University

References 

1970 births
Living people
Chinese television presenters
Communication University of China alumni
People from Shanghai
Chinese women journalists
Chinese women television presenters
Hui people